The 2021 Guangzhou season is the 68th year in Guangzhou's existence and its 54th season in the Chinese football league, also its 32nd season in the top flight.

Transfers

In

Out

Statistics

Appearances and goals

References 

Guangzhou F.C.
Guangzhou F.C. seasons